The 2011–12 Iowa State Cyclones women's basketball team represented Iowa State University in the 2011–12 NCAA Division I Women's Basketball season. The Cyclones were coached by Bill Fennelly and played their home games at Hilton Coliseum in Ames, Iowa. The 2011-12 Cyclones finished tied for 3rd in the Big 12 Conference and were invited to the 2012 NCAA Women's Division I Basketball Tournament for the sixth consecutive season.

Hilton Magic proved to be an overwhelming advantage for the Cyclones with home attendance ranked 3rd (10,125 average) in the nation.

Roster

Schedule

|-
!colspan=9| Pre-Season (Exhibition)

|-
!colspan=9| Regular season

|-
!colspan=9| Big 12 Tournament

|-
!colspan=9| NCAA Division 1 Tournament

Regular season

Player stats

Postseason

Team players drafted into the WNBA

References

Iowa State Cyclones women's basketball seasons
Iowa State Cyc
Iowa State Cyc
Iowa State